Bilaval or Bilawal is the most basic of all the ten thaats of Hindustani classical music of the Indian subcontinent. All the swaras in the thaat are shuddha or all swaras in the natural scale. Bilaval as a raga is not rendered these days however a small variation of the raga called Alhaiya Bilaval is very common. This is a morning raga and its pictorial descriptions create a rich, sensuous ambience in consonance with its performance.

Ragas
Ragas in Bilaval include:

Alhaiya Bilawal
Bhinna Shadja
Bihag
Bilaval
Deshkar
Devgiri Bilawal
Durga
Hamsadhvani
Hemant
Kukubh Bilawal
Shankara
Sukhiya
Shukla Bilawal
Pahadi
Mand (raga)

References

Hindustani music terminology